Hernando Today was a daily newspaper based in Brooksville, Florida covering Hernando  County. It was closed by the Tampa Tribune on November 30, 2014. There are still two newspapers covering Hernando County: Tampa Bay Times and Hernando Sun.

References

Defunct newspapers published in Florida
Hernando County, Florida
2014 disestablishments in Florida
Publications disestablished in 2014